Hairsine may refer to:

Trevor Hairsine, a British artist
Hairsine, Edmonton, a neighbourhood in Canada